The 2021–22 2. Liga was the 29th season of the 2. Liga in Slovakia, since its establishment in 1993.

Changes
The following teams have changed division since the 2020–21 season:

To 2. liga
Relegated from Fortuna liga
 None, because relegated club FC Nitra did not obtain license for the new 2. liga season.

Promoted from 3. liga
 Rohožník (Bratislava)
 Námestovo (Middle)
 Humenné (East)

From 2. liga
Promoted to Fortuna liga
 Liptovský Mikuláš

Relegated to 3. liga
 Poprad

Teams

Stadiums and locations

Personnel and kits
Note: Flags indicate national team as has been defined under FIFA eligibility rules. Players and Managers may hold more than one non-FIFA nationality.

League table

Results
Each team plays home-and-away against every other team in the league, for a total of 30 matches each.

Season statistics

Top goalscorers

Top assists

Clean sheets

Discipline

Player

Most yellow cards: 10
  Erik Streňo (Humenné)

Most red cards: 2
  Tomáš Filipiak (Trebišov)
  Martin Luberda (Humenné)
  Ondřej Rudzan (Skalica)
  Matej Moško (Košice)

Club

Most yellow cards: 82
Komárno

Most red cards: 7
Bardejov

Awards

Annual awards

Team of the Season
Source:
Goalkeeper:  Richard Ludha (Podbrezová)
Defenders:  Peter Kováčik (Podbrezová),  Marek Bartoš (Podbrezová),  Ondřej Rudzan (Skalica),  René Paraj (Podbrezová),  Šimon Šmehýl (Komárno)
Midfielders:   Samuel Ďatko (Podbrezová),  Roland Galčík (Podbrezová),  Erik Streňo (Humenné),  Erik Pačinda (Košice)
Forward:  Róbert Polievka (B.Bystrica)

Individual Awards

Manager of the Season

 Roman Skuhravý (Podbrezová)

Player of the Season

 Róbert Polievka (B.Bystrica)

Young Player of the Season

 Roland Galčík (Podbrezová)

References

External links

2021–22 in Slovak football leagues
2020-21
Slovak